William Wilson (1823 – November 13, 1874) was a native of England who emigrated to New York and was a Union Army officer during the American Civil War.

Biography
Wilson had been a prize fighter and was associated with New York City Democratic political machine being a member of the so-called Mozart Hall Democracy faction headed by Fernando Wood. In 1856, Wilson was elected as an alderman with the backing of the Democratic Party. He was also a real estate agent.

On May 25, 1861, Wilson was appointed colonel of the 6th New York Volunteer Infantry, known as Billy Wilson's Zouaves.

On May 11, 1861, he was featured on the cover of the Harper's Weekly illustrated by Winslow Homer after Mathew Brady's photograph.

Wilson served in Florida and Louisiana in 1862 and early 1863. He was mustered out of the U.S. Volunteers on June 25, 1863.

In 1864, Wilson was placed in command of a militia regiment, the 69th New York Regiment, by Governor Seymour.

On July 20, 1866, President Andrew Johnson nominated Wilson for appointment to the grade of brevet brigadier general of volunteers, to rank from March 13, 1865, and the United States Senate confirmed the appointment on July 26, 1866.

William Wilson died on November 13, 1874 in New York City. He was buried at Calvary Cemetery (Queens, New York).

See also

Fort Jefferson, Florida
Battle of Santa Rosa Island
List of American Civil War brevet generals (Union)

References

Further reading 
 Morris, Gouverneur. The history of a volunteer regiment : being a succinct account of the organization, services and adventures of the Sixth Regiment New York Volunteers Infantry known as Wilson Zouaves: where they went, what they did, and what they saw in the War of the Rebellion, 1861 to 1865. New York, 1891

External links 
 Billy Wilson's Rough Zouaves: 6th Regiment of Infantry New York Civil War Newspaper Clippings

1823 births
1874 deaths
Union Army colonels
People of New York (state) in the American Civil War